Tirat Carmel, or Tirat HaCarmel, is a city in the Haifa District in Israel.

Throughout the ages, the site of the modern city was controlled by many people, including the Romans, the Ottoman, and the British. The modern city was established on the site of the Palestinian Arab village of al-Tira. The town of Tirat Carmel was officially declared a city in 1992.

History
Tirat Carmel is built on the ruins of the town of al-Tira. Crusaders called it St Yohan de Tire. It was ruled by the Ottomans in late medieval and Renaissance times and was an agricultural area with wheat and goats and other farms. While conscription in the late 1800s harmed the town, it recovered, and by 1945 was an agricultural Muslim community with a Christian minority. The town was known for production of olives and almonds.

In 1949 two absorption centers were established for Jewish immigrants in the same location, which in 1954 were reorganized into the municipality of Tirat Carmel.

Demographics
According to CBS, in 2001 the ethnic makeup of the city was 99.6% Jewish and other non-Arab, with no significant Arab population.

According to CBS, in 2001 there were 9,200 males and 9,300 females. The population of the city was spread out, with 31.2% 19 years of age or younger, 16.7% between 20 and 29, 19.4% between 30 and 44, 17.8% from 45 to 59, 4.1% from 60 to 64, and 10.9% 65 years of age or older. The population growth rate in 2001 was 0.8%.

Income
According to CBS, as of 2000, in the city there were 6,068 salaried workers and 411 are self-employed. The mean monthly wage in 2000 for a salaried worker in the city is ILS 4,428, a real change of 6.6% over the course of 2000. Salaried males have a mean monthly wage of ILS 5,621 (a real change of 4.3%) versus ILS 3,211 for females (a real change of 9.0%). The mean income for the self-employed is 4,818. There are 450 people who receive unemployment benefits and 1,891 people who receive an income guarantee.

Education
According to CBS, there are 9 schools and 3,049 students in the city. They are spread out, as 6 elementary schools and 1,681 elementary school students, and 6 high schools and 1,368 high school students. 59.8% of 12th grade students were entitled to a matriculation certificate in 2001.

Notable people

Reuven Atar (born 1967), footballer
Roi Atar (born 1994), footballer
Marco Balbul (born 1967), former footballer and manager
Rostam Bastuni (1923–1994), politician and journalist, first Israeli Arab to represent a Zionist party in the Knesset 
Rafi Cohen (born 1974), footballer
Carmel Eliash (1933–1973), politician
Sharon Gal (born 1974), journalist and politician
Haim Megrelashvili (born 1982), footballer
Gene Simmons (born 1949 as "Gene Klein"), musician, singer, actor, bassist and co-lead singer of Kiss
Shalom Asayag (born 1969), Actor and comedian.

Twin towns
 Maurepas, France
 Monheim am Rhein, Germany
 Veszprém, Hungary
 Shamakhi, Azerbaijan

References

External links
Tirat Carmel Municipality 

Cities in Israel
Cities in Haifa District